Robert Desjarlais (26 August 1907 – 17 July 1987) was a Canadian fencer. He competed in the three team events at the 1948 Summer Olympics.

References

External links
 

1907 births
1987 deaths
Canadian male fencers
Olympic fencers of Canada
Fencers at the 1948 Summer Olympics
Fencers at the 1950 British Empire Games
People from Montérégie
Commonwealth Games medallists in fencing
Commonwealth Games silver medallists for Canada
Commonwealth Games bronze medallists for Canada
Medallists at the 1950 British Empire Games